Spilarctia postrubida is a moth in the family Erebidae. It was described by Alfred Ernest Wileman in 1910. It is found in Taiwan, Japan's Ryukyu Islands and the Chinese provinces of Guangdong and Hainan.

References

Moths described in 1910
postrubida